Deanwood is an island-platformed Washington Metro station in the Deanwood neighborhood of Northeast Washington, D.C., United States. The station was opened on November 20, 1978, and is operated by the Washington Metropolitan Area Transit Authority (WMATA). Providing service for the Orange Line, the station is the final station in the District of Columbia going east. The station is located at Minnesota Avenue and 48th Street Northeast. It is architecturally similar to its sister station, Minnesota Avenue.

History
The station opened on November 20, 1978.

In May 2018, Metro announced an extensive renovation of platforms at twenty stations across the system. New Carrollton station was closed from May 28, 2022, through September 5, 2022, as part of the summer platform improvement project, which also affected the Minnesota Avenue, Deanwood, Cheverly, and Landover stations on the Orange Line. Shuttle buses and free parking were provided at the closed stations.

Station layout

Notable places nearby
Kenilworth Aquatic Gardens

References

External links
 

 The Schumin Web Transit Center: Deanwood Station
 Minnesota Avenue entrance from Google Maps Street View
 Polk Street entrance from Google Maps Street View

Stations on the Orange Line (Washington Metro)
Washington Metro stations in Washington, D.C.
Railway stations in the United States opened in 1978
1978 establishments in Washington, D.C.